St. John's Church, Marchington Woodlands is a parish church in Marchington Woodlands, Staffordshire, United Kingdom. Built in 1859, this small country church is the only church within the parish of Marchington Woodlands.

History
The church was built in 1859 and was designed by Mark Parsons.

Churchyard
The churchyard contains the war grave of a World War I soldier of the Royal Field Artillery.

Today
The church lies in the Deanery of Uttoxeter and the archdeaconry of Stoke-on-Trent in the Diocese of Lichfield.

See also
Listed buildings in Marchington

References

External links
 Uttoxeter area of Parishes
 Official Website

Church of England church buildings in Staffordshire
Church of England church buildings in the Borough of East Staffordshire
John